East Darfur State ( Wilāyat Šarq Dārfūr; Sharq Darfur) is one of the states of Sudan, and one of five comprising the Darfur region. It was created in January 2012 as a result of the ongoing peace process for the wider Darfur region. The state capital is Ed Daein. The state was formed from land that was part of the state of South Darfur.

Districts 
 ad-Du'ain
 Abu Jabra
 Abu Karinka
 Adila
 Assalaya
 Bahr el Arab
 El Ferdous
 Yassin
 Schearia

References

 
States of Sudan
Darfur
States and territories established in 2012
2012 establishments in Sudan